CHES (N-cyclohexyl-2-aminoethanesulfonic acid) is a buffering agent.  CHES buffers have a useful range of pH 8.6–10.

It typically appears as a white crystalline powder.

Effect of impurities
Commercial preparations of CHES (and other sulfonylethyl buffers like MES, BES, and PIPES) can contain a contaminant oligo(vinylsulfonic acid) (OVS), which is a polyanionic mimic of RNA, and can be a potent (pM) inhibitor of RNA binding proteins and enzymes.

References

External links

Buffer solutions
Sulfonic acids